The Kentucky Scottish Weekend was a regional highland game held annually at General Butler State Resort Park in Carrollton, Kentucky. The weekend's mission was to celebrate the customs and traditions of Scotland.  It was held each year on the second full weekend in May. First held in 1983, the weekend celebrated its thirtieth anniversary in 2012, its final year. It was the longest running highland game currently being held in Kentucky at the time it ended. It was held in Carrollton due to that location being nearly halfway between Louisville and Cincinnati.  A Kentucky non-profit corporation—Kentucky Scottish Weekend, Inc.—held the event. The weekend was sometimes referred to as "KSW" for short.

The weekend was one of three regional highland games in Kentucky. The others are the Glasgow Highland Games in Glasgow and the West Kentucky Highland Festival in Murray, founded in 1986 and 1998, respectively.

A variety of vendors usually attended the event. Items sold included Scottish and American food items, Celtic collectibles, kilts, Scottish music, Clan memorabilia, and Scottish heathers.

Events

Athletic competitions, including:
Caber tossing
Hammer throw - .
Sheaf toss
Stone throw
Weight toss - .
Bagpipe and drumming competitions (the event was recognized by the Eastern United States Pipe Band Association)
Several regional pipe bands regularly competed at the weekend, including Cincinnati Caledonian Pipes and Drums and the Louisville Pipe Band
Bonniest knees contest (where men competed for the "best" set of knees; judged by females and through touch alone)
Border Collie demonstrations
British car show
Ceilidh on Saturday night
Clan booths
Kirking of the Tartan (non-denominational church service) on Sunday morning
Opening ceremony with massed bands
Parade of Tartans
Pipe band concerts
Scottish folk music concerts
Scottish highland dancing competitions and demonstrations
Wellie toss contest (where women competed to see who can throw a boot the farthest)

Entertainers

Alex Beaton had been the featured performer and emcee at the Kentucky Scottish Weekend since 1989. In later years, other performers included Seven Nations, the Glengarry Bhoys, and Wicked Tinkers.

Dissolution

KSW was dissolved and the remaining funds disbursed to The Scottish Society of Louisville.

References

External links
Kentucky Scottish Weekend website
General Butler State Resort Park website 
Glasgow Highland Games website
West Kentucky Highland Festival website
The Eastern United States Pipe Band Association (EUSPBA) website 

Highland games
Festivals in Kentucky
Tourist attractions in Carroll County, Kentucky
Cultural festivals in the United States
Scottish-American culture
Scottish-American culture in Kentucky
Multi-sport events in the United States
1983 establishments in Kentucky
2012 disestablishments in Kentucky
Recurring sporting events established in 1983
Recurring sporting events disestablished in 2012
Sports festivals in the United States